Xiaan is an under construction metro station on the Wanda–Zhonghe–Shulin line located in Zhongzheng, Taipei, Taiwan. The station is scheduled to open at the end of 2025.

Station overview 
The station will be a two-level, underground station with an island platform. The theme of the station will be based on "Lohas Taipei" while the architectural design of the station is based on the creation of lightweight visual effects.

Station layout

Around the station 
Nanjichang Night Market

References 

Wanda–Zhonghe–Shulin line stations
Railway stations scheduled to open in 2025